Arnold Sorina (born 1 June 1988 in Port Vila) is a Vanuatuan middle-distance runner.  He competed in the 800 metres competition at the 2012 Summer Olympics but did not advance to the semifinals.

Achievements

References

External links
 

1988 births
Living people
Vanuatuan male middle-distance runners
Olympic athletes of Vanuatu
Athletes (track and field) at the 2012 Summer Olympics
Commonwealth Games competitors for Vanuatu
Athletes (track and field) at the 2006 Commonwealth Games
Athletes (track and field) at the 2010 Commonwealth Games
People from Port Vila